The Minions of Ka is a graphic novel series. In the series, many of history's greatest disasters, such as the Great Fire of London and the Black Plague, are attempts to cover-up attacks of the undead.

Publication history
The Minions of Ka was created in 2007 by Dave Wilbur, Michael Furno, and Michael Ahearn, collectively Zombie Omega, Inc, and the first book was released in August 2008 at DragonCon in Atlanta, Georgia. The first Minions project was managed by Christian Beranek, features interior art by Chris Moreno and Mario Boon, and was edited by horror author Jack Ketchum, who also contributed The Western Dead, an original short story based on The Minions of Ka series. The cover is by artist Ken Kelly.

Book Two in The Minions of Ka series was slated for release in 2010 and explores the lore more deeply.

Film
Zombie Omega, has signed a movie option with Ahmet Zappa and Christian Beranek of Monsterfoot Productions, Inc.

Notes

External links

Interviews 

 Furno's Zombie Minions of Ka, Comicon.com, March 31, 2009
 Pete's Basement Episode 45 - 12.02.08
 The Minions of Ka Crawl from the Grave

Horror graphic novels
Alternate history comics
Horror comics
Zombies in comics
2008 comics debuts